The XT Mobile Network is a UMTS and LTE mobile network run by Spark New Zealand (formerly Telecom New Zealand). The network was initially built nationwide on WCDMA/UMTS 850 MHz, with 2100 MHz infill in major urban areas. The UMTS network is HSPA+ enabled, with a maximum downlink transmission rate of 21.1 Mbit/s and an uplink rate of 5.2 Mbit/s attainable for capable hardware. HSPA+ has a theoretical maximum of 56 Mbit/s download speed and 22 Mbit/s upload speed.  Then under Spark 4G LTE is being built out. The network is not 2G capable, Telecom never operated a public GSM network.

After lengthy internal and corporate trials, the XT Network was launched to the public on 29 May 2009, at 7:30 am. The network was the successor to Telecom NZ's CDMA mobile network. With the shutdown of CDMA in 2012, XT is currently the company's sole mobile network.

The name "XT Mobile Network" does not get used by Spark anymore, it has been called: "XT Mobile Network", then "The Smartphone Network" under Telecom, and now "Spark Mobile" under Spark.

New features
With the launch of the XT network, a number of new services were available to subscribers, including Prepaid roaming, video calls, Mobile TV, and high-speed internet access.

Launch

On 27 April 2009, Telecom announced that the new XT Mobile network would launch on 13 May 2009 at 6:30pm.
However, a Vodafone New Zealand and Telecom dispute about network interference pushed the date to 29 May.

In May 2009, Vodafone sued Telecom, accusing it of interfering with their network, using the same frequency bands as their existing 3G network. However, Telecom had said it is working with Vodafone to resolve the issues and was surprised by that company's decision to pursue legal action. A decision was made between the two companies to increase the filtering of the network, with neither company stating who was footing the bill.

Network outages 

On Monday, 14 December 2009 at approximately 4:30 am, the Telecom XT Mobile Network went down for the majority of people who live south of Taupo for eight hours (although there were claims of issues slightly before this time). Telecom said a technical fault, affecting a Christchurch-based technology component that was installed to fix a prior fault, had caused the loss of mobile service, including voice, SMS, and mobile broadband

At approximately 7:00 am on the morning of the network outage, Telecom published a statement via Twitter acknowledging the issues. The network was fully restored by approximately 5:00 pm the same day. The older CDMA network was not affected during the outage of the XT network.

On Wednesday, 27 January 2010 around mid-morning, the Telecom XT Mobile Network once again suffered a major outage, affecting approximately 100,000 customers south of Taupo. The outage was believed to be caused by similar circumstances as the late-2009 event. This was fixed for many users within around 7 hours; however, many areas including Queenstown, Timaru, Dunedin and Invercargill had still not been restored as of Thursday 28 January 2010 at 7:00 pm, with some users experiencing up to 3 days without service in some areas. This second network crash in two months caused a considerable public uproar and raised serious questions about the credibility of Telecom and its XT Network.

More recently: On Wednesday, 11 February 2015 at around 5:30 pm the Spark mobile network suffered another major outage, preventing customers nationwide from making or receiving calls, sending/receiving text messages and using mobile data.

Advertising

Before and immediately after launch the XT mobile network was promoted by three advertisements hosted by Richard Hammond, and following this was an advert featuring stuntwoman/actress Zoë Bell, advertising speed and roaming capabilities.

Telecom claimed that the XT Network to be "Faster in more places" than any other mobile network in New Zealand, including competitor Vodafone and start-up 2degrees; these claims were backed by independent testing commissioned by Telecom. Advertising material at the time proclaimed the network to reach "97% of places Kiwis live and work". This claim was quietly removed in early 2010.

As of 2011 the meaning of "XT" remains unknown to the public, as even Telecom's website fails to address this anomaly. An independent news website featured a "Q&A" having questions submitted by the public and answers from Telecom representatives, and one of the questions asked addressed this: "What time on friday will the network launch? What does XT stand for? XTra? tXT? eXTraordinary? Xtra Telecom?". The network's response only addressed the first part of the question: "The official XT Launch time is 07:30 29 May 2009."

Competitors

Spark has two mobile network competitors in the New Zealand market.

Vodafone New Zealand which operates a GSM 900/1800 network since 1993, a WCDMA 2100 MHz network since 2005 and were also the first to launch a 4G LTE network in NZ. Vodafone, in response to Telecom's "Faster in More Places" claim, had constructed a nationwide WCDMA 900 MHz network in areas where they did not already have an existing 2100 MHz network.

2degrees, GSM 3G 900/2100 network. They have built a 4G LTE service enabled 2014.

Spark, 2Degrees and Vodafone all operate 4G networks in LTE band 3 and LTE band 28, with band 3 coverage mostly in cities and towns; band 28 available predominantly across rural towns, countryside, highways and coastal areas. Both Spark and Vodafone have licences to provide LTE band 7 services.

4G LTE Network 

"The 4G LTE coverage was initially offered to subscribers in Auckland, Wellington and Christchurch starting 12 November 2013. Telecom estimates that half of its smartphone network will be able to offer 4G LTE by the end of 2014." The frequencies that are used for LTE are 1800 MHz (LTE Band 3) initially, then additionally 700 MHz when analogue TV frequencies were retired. The first 4G 700 MHz (LTE Band 28) cell sites came online in areas of rural Waikato in mid 2014. Spark also has 2600 MHz (LTE band 7), and 2300 MHz (LTE band 40) LTE, carrier aggregation is available, with a compatible handset band 3 (1800 MHz) and band 7, band 28 and band 40 can be used simultaneously to speed up data access (available in many sites across both rural, and urban NZ).

As of 2021, Spark claims 4G is available to over 90% of the New Zealand population

In 2017, Spark started a rollout for LTE Advanced also known as 4.5G delivering speeds up to 1Gbps. This feature is compatible with most higher-end smartphones and cellular tablets.

5G Network 

Spark launched its 5G Wireless Broadband service on September 26, 2019 in Alexandra, Westport, Twizel, Tekapo, Hokitika and Clyde.

Spark launched its 5G Mobile service in July 2020. Spark 5G is N78 in the 3500 MHz range and is compatible with selected devices such as the Apple iPhone 12 series or Samsung Galaxy 5G series. As of November 2021; Spark 5G is still free for all customers.

In August 2021, Spark announced they will invest an additional $35 million to accelerate its 5G rollout - and aims to expand 5G coverage to 50% of the population by the end of 2022, and 90% of the population by the end of 2023. The accelerated rollout will introduce 5G to an additional 15 locations across New Zealand by the end of 22; including expanding and upgrading existing 5G cellular sites. The 5G upgrade plan will allow Spark to meet the growing demand for data, which grows by approximately 40% per year. 5G will also be utilised by Skinny (Spark's Virtual Operator) for Wireless Broadband; including subsidised Skinny Jump for low-income households; to deliver more capacity to more customers. As the 5G network is expanded and upgraded; 4G will also receive upgrades with an additional range of RCG towers to be deployed. As well as utilising the current N78 5G standard for urban areas; Spark plans to enable access to the 600MHZ band to allow further coverage. Spark's 5G rollout is dependant if the Radio Spectrum Management authorises their required frequencies.

Spark's 5G compatibility is limited to approved devices only; which also require VoLTE. Imported/incompatible devices are unlikely to connect to Spark 5G. Spark 5G Devices. This is not seen with Vodafone; where 5G automatically provisions on almost any 5G-enabled device; whereas Spark only provisions on their selected devices.

References

Mobile phone companies of New Zealand